Andel is a village in the municipality of Altena, North Brabant, in the Netherlands. It is located about 7 km southeast of Gorinchem.

History 
Op-Andel was first mentioned in 850 as Analo, and means "higher open forest". Neer-Andel was mentioned in 1382 as "dat derp tot Uutandele", and means the lower or downstream part. The villages developed on the banks of the Afgedamde Maas. The village used to consist of two parts: an upstream part named Op-Andel, and a downstream part named Neer-Andel
(). Later both merged into a single urban area. Roman pottery has been discovered from the 2nd century.

The oldest church dates from the 14th century. It later became a ruin and was partially demolished. The Rombouts tower has been restored in 1954. The current Dutch Reformed church dates from the 16th century, and has been enlarged in 1852 and around 1950.

Andel was home to 738 people in 1840. Until 1973, Andel was an independent municipality when it was merged into Woudrichem. In 2019, it became part of Altena.

Gallery

References

Former municipalities of North Brabant
Populated places in North Brabant
Geography of Altena, North Brabant